Osiek  is a village in the administrative district of Gmina Joniec, within Płońsk County, Masovian Voivodeship, in east-central Poland.

Between 1975 and 1998, this place belonged to the Ciechanów Voivodeship.

References

Osiek